Kent Hollow is a valley in the Appalachian Mountains in the town of Kent in Litchfield County, Connecticut. It is situated in the upper reaches of the West Aspetuck River, one of the cleanest rivers in Southern New England and itself classified as AA water quality. The Hollow is occupied by four historic farms: Wilsea, DeVaux, Rehnberg, and Anderson. It is threatened by development with several large homes built by New York weekenders in the past two decades.

It is located about 2 miles west of New Preston, about 2 miles northwest of Marble Dale, and about 6 miles southeast from the town center of Kent.

External links
Kent Hollow Cemetery
Topo Map of Kent Hollow

Landforms of Litchfield County, Connecticut
Valleys of Connecticut